The Ottoman Empire (referred to as Turkey) competed at the 1912 Summer Olympics in Stockholm, Sweden.

Athletics

Two athletes represented Turkey, both of whom were ethnic Armenians. It was the nation's first appearance in the sport of athletics.

Ranks given are within that athlete's heat for running events.

References
Official Olympic Reports

Nations at the 1912 Summer Olympics
1912
Olympics
Sport in the Ottoman Empire